Kannanalloor is a village situated in Thrikkovilvattom gramapanchayat in Kollam District, Kerala state, India.

Politics
Kannanalloor is a part of Kundara assembly constituency in Kollam (Lok Sabha constituency). Shri. P.C.Vishnunadh is the current MLA of Kundara. Shri.N. K. Premachandran is the current member of parliament of Kollam. CPM, INC, RSP, SDPI, BJP etc. are the major political parties.

Geography
Kannanalloor is a small village in Thrikkovilvattom panchayat. It is 13 km from Kollam, 2 km from Mukhathala and 62 km from Thiruvananthapuram. It connects places Mylakkad, Nedumpana, Kottiyam, Palathara, Adichanalloor, etc.

Demographics
Malayalam is the native language of Kannanalloor.

References

Geography of Kollam district